Bilgeç is a village in the Ovacık District, Tunceli Province, Turkey. The village is populated by Kurds of the Şaman tribe and had a population of 11 in 2021.

The hamlets of Başlamış, Çalbaşı, Dolmataş, Emirganderesi, Karaoğlan, Konak and Sarıoğlan are attached to the village.

References 

Kurdish settlements in Tunceli Province
Villages in Ovacık District